No Introduction Necessary is a "super session" studio album. Initially it was conceived as debut album by Keith De Groot (aka Gerry Temple), a new singer discovered by producer Reg Tracey. It featured Albert Lee and Big Jim Sullivan on guitars, John Paul Jones on bass, Nicky Hopkins on keyboards, Chris Hughes on saxophone and Clem Cattini on drums. The sessions took place at Olympic Studios in London. Nine songs had been completed when neither Lee nor Sullivan were going to be able to take part in next booked session. Tracey called Jimmy Page (who had already worked on Beck's Bolero with Jones and Hopkins) for the last round of recordings. Page's participation likely took place in either September or December 1967 during breaks from touring with the Yardbirds.

Eventually Tracey decided that De Groot had been sidelined by the talent of session musicians. The album did little sales and soon was deleted. There were many reissues in different countries under different titles, some of them with alternative track order and/or bonus tracks:
Super Rock (French and Belgian LP, 1975)
Everything I Do Is Wrong (1993)
Voodoo Blues (1995)
Todo Lo Que Hago Está Mal (Argentina, 1996)
Lovin' Up a Storm (1996, 2000)
Playin' Up a Storm (2011)
Who Rocks It Better? (2012)

The album consists mostly of cover versions of songs by Jerry Lee Lewis, Buddy Holly and other rock & roll artists of the era as well as several original cuts composed by Keith De Groot and Nicky Hopkins.

Track listing

2002 Purple Pyramid bonus tracks
The following tracks are from another album featuring Jimmy Page and Nicky Hopkins – Lord Sutch and Heavy Friends:

2012 "Who Rocks It Better?" track listing
Tracks were reordered on this vinyl edition with bonus CD. Tracks 1 to 6 (side A of vinyl) feature Jimmy Page, and tracks 7 to 14 (side B of vinyl) feature Albert Lee and Big Jim Sullivan on guitar.

Personnel
John Paul Jones – bass
Clem Cattini – drums
Albert Lee and Big Jim Sullivan – guitars on "Lovin' Up a Storm", "Boll Weevil", "Livin' Lovin' Wreck", "One Long Kiss", "Down the Line", "Breathless", "Rave On" and "Everyday"
Jimmy Page – guitar on "Everything I Do Is Wrong", "Think It Over", "Dixie Fried", "Fabulous", "Lonely Weekend" and "Burn Up"
Nicky Hopkins – piano
Keith David De Groot – vocals
Chris Hughes – tenor saxophone
Technical
Glyn Johns – engineer
Reg Tracey – producer
Alan A. Freeman – executive producer
Nigel Molden – coordinator
For bonus tracks 15–20 see Lord Sutch and Heavy Friends

See also
Super Session
Music from Free Creek
Fleetwood Mac in Chicago
The London Howlin' Wolf Sessions
Supershow
Supergroup (music)

References

1968 albums
Rock albums by American artists
Rock albums by British artists
Jimmy Page albums
Purple Pyramid Records albums